Mahmoud Ali Othman (born 1938) was a member of the Interim Iraq Governing Council created following the United States's 2003 invasion of Iraq. A Kurd and Sunni Muslim, Othman was a member of the Political Bureau Kurdistan Democratic Party (KDP). He then founded the Kurdish Socialist Party. He was also the Chief Negotiator in the 1970 agreement with the Baath Party. He is now a leading member of the Iraqi National Assembly.

Othman was born in Sulaimaniyah. He became politically active at the age of 18. He completed a degree in Medicine at the University of Baghdad where he received first-class honours. He has five daughters and three sons.

He was also a key player in the Kurdish struggle for autonomy. Othman is now an independent politician best known for his press interviews. He was also a front runner in the 1992 election in the Kurdistan Region. He currently plays an advisory role towards Kurdish national issues, taking no active part in recent elections in 2009.

Timeline 
1954 - Joined the Kurdish Struggle
1962 - Became a member of the Kurdistan Democratic Party (KDP).
1968 - Became Mustafa Barzani's Deputy dealing with foreign affairs of the revolution.
1970 - Chief Negotiator in the agreement of ceasefire between the Kurdish region and the Ba'th Party
1980 - He founded the Kurdish Socialist Party with Rasool Mahmend, Adel Murad and Adnan Al Mufti 
1980 - Became Leader of the Kurdish Socialist Party
1992 - Ran in the Kurdistan Regional Elections.
1992 - Went into exile in the UK.
1995 - First return from exile to the Kurdish region.
2001 - Was top politician in peace talks between the Kurdistan Democratic Party (KDP) and the Patriotic Union Of Kurdistan (PUK)
 2003 - Became member of the Interim Iraq Governing Council
 2004 - Became member of Iraqi National Assembly.
 2005 - Becomes head of the list of the Kurdistan Alliance in the forthcoming elections.
 2006 - Elected member of Iraqi National Assembly.
 2010 - Re-Elected member of Iraqi National Assembly for Al Sulaymaniyah Province
 2010 - Leading MP to form the Kurdish coalition for Baghdad which consists of (Kurdistani List, Change List, Services & Reform List, Islamic Parties)

References

External links 
 Who's who in post-Saddam Iraq

Members of the Council of Representatives of Iraq
1938 births
Living people
Kurdish nationalists
Kurdistan Democratic Party politicians
Kurdistan Socialist Democratic Party politicians
University of Baghdad alumni